Dethiobacter alkaliphilus  is a bacterium from the genus of Dethiobacter which has been isolated from sediments from a soda lake in the Mongolia.

References

Eubacteriales
Bacteria described in 2008